HCC Coleman College for Health Sciences is a community college based in Houston, Texas which is focused on health sciences. The school is part of the Houston Community College System, and is a member institution of the Texas Medical Center, which is located nearby.

External links
 

Two-year colleges in the United States
Universities and colleges in Houston